King Píng of Chu (died 516 BC).  During the Spring and Autumn period of ancient China, he was king of the State of Chu from 528 BC to 516 BC. He was a son of King Gong of Chu and his consort (a sibling of King Zi'ao).

Born Xiong Qiji, Píng changed his name to Xiong Ju after ascending the throne, and King Píng was his posthumous title. The likely reason for his name change was his response to a naming taboo.

He married Bo Ying and was succeeded by their son, King Zhao of Chu.

References

Monarchs of Chu (state)
6th-century BC Chinese monarchs
Year of birth unknown
516 BC deaths
Chinese kings